The National Task Force to End Local Communist Armed Conflict (NTF-ELCAC) is a task force organized by the government of the Philippines to respond and raise awareness to the ongoing communist rebellion in the Philippines.

Background 

The National Task Force to End Local Communist Armed Conflict (NTF-ELCAC) was formed on December 4, 2018, pursuant to Executive Order No. 70 issued by President Rodrigo Duterte which institutionalized the government's "whole-of-nation" approach in tackling the ongoing communist rebellion in the Philippines led by the Communist Party of the Philippines (CPP) and its armed wing, the New People's Army (NPA). The "whole-of-nation" approach is contrasted to prior policy which favored irregular peace talks with communist rebels. The executive order was announced to the public on December 10.

The formation of the NTF-ELCAC followed the formal termination of peace talks between the Philippine government and the NPA when President Rodrigo Duterte issued Presidential Proclamation 360 on November 23, 2017, citing continued attacks by the NPA despite the then ongoing peace negotiations. The CPP and NPA were likewise formally designated as terrorist organizations by the government.

Activities and programs

Campaign against suspected front organizations 
The NTF-ELCAC maintains a campaign against the ongoing communist rebellion in the Philippines, as well as against groups that it claims to be front organizations of the communist group. It maintains that it has the duty to warn the public against "dubious groups with links to communist terrorist organizations". The task force's allegations has been criticized as an act of "red-tagging". The NTF-ELCAC on its part falsely claim that the term "red-tagging" was invented by the CPP-NPA and the usage of such term is a move to discredit the task force's allegations.

Among the notable groups the NTF-ELCAC has alleged to be the communist rebel front is the Makabayan bloc, whose members were elected to the House of Representatives. The allegations of the NTF-ELCAC is an "official stance" of the task force. The NTF-ELCAC also made the same accusation against left-wing human rights organization Karapatan, which filed a lawsuit against the task force for violations against Philippine Act on Crimes Against International Humanitarian Law, Genocide and Other Crimes Against Humanity in response.

The NTF-ELCAC's also conducted background checks on organizers of community pantries set up by volunteers as a response to the COVID-19 pandemic for possible links to the CPP-NPA, which led to calls to defund the NTC-ELCAC.

Barangay Development Program 
The Barangay Development Program (BDP) is a socioeconomic program of the NTF-ELCAC for barangays that have been deemed free from communist rebel influence by the national government. It is described by the task force as an approach to address the root causes of insurgency such as "hunger, disease, poverty, injustice and hopelessness" so that the communities would be less susceptible to fall under the influence of the communist insurgents. The CPP has downplayed the BDP, calling it a "band-aid solution" and believed that the program does not satisfy the "fundamental demand for genuine land reform and the clamor for respect of ancestral lands".

Balik Loob Program 
The Balik Loob Program provides a mechanism for former communist rebels who surrendered to the government to reintegrate to mainstream society.

Administrative and criminal complaints 
The officials of the NTF-ELCAC face complaints before the Office of the Ombudsman and the Commission on Elections. In December 2020, Karapatan alleged in a complaint that Duterte supporter and NTF-ELCAC spokesperson Lorraine Badoy is criminally and administratively liable for her "persistent, relentless and malicious red-tagging and vilification" of Karapatan. Also named in the complaint was then-NTF-ELCAC spokesperson Lt. Gen. Antonio Parlade.

In March 2022, Kabataan Rep. Sarah Jane Elago, Gabriela Rep. Arlene Brosas, and ACT Rep. France Castro filed criminal complaints against Badoy and nine other NTF-ELCAC executives for electioneering and allegedly violating the Omnibus Election Code. The complaints cited two separate statements issued by the NTF-ELCAC: On March 14, Badoy alleged that presidential candidate Leni Robredo made a pact with the Communist Party of the Philippines-New People's Army-National Democratic Front (CPP-NPA-NDF); On March 21, Badoy released a statement alleging that Kabataan, Anakpawis, Bayan Muna, ACT Teachers, and Gabriela are "urban operatives" of the CPP-NPA-NDF. The complaint contends that the statements constitute "political advertisement" or "election propaganda".

Administration 
The NTF-ELCAC was created as a government organization under the Office of the President of the Philippines with the Philippine president serving as its chairman, and the National Security Advisor as its vice chairman. Other members include:

Secretaries of the following executive departments
Department of National Defense
Department of the Interior and Local Government
Department of Justice
Department of Social Welfare and Development
Department of Education
Department of Information and Communications Technology
Department of Finance
Department of Budget and Management
Department of Public Works and Highways
Department of Agrarian Reform

Other
Office of the Presidential Adviser on Peace, Reconciliation and Unity
Armed Forces of the Philippines, Chairman of the Joint Chiefs
Philippine National Police, Chief
National Intelligence Coordinating Agency
National Commission on Indigenous Peoples, Chairman
National Economic and Development Authority, Director General
Commission on Higher Education (Philippines), Chairperson
Technical Education and Skills Development Authority, Director General
And two representatives from the private sector appointed by the President

Communications 
The NTF-ELCAC has eight spokespersons, each dedicated to certain matter/s. Prior to May 10, 2021, the task force only had two spokespersons. There are plans to have additional spokespersons to cover each of the Philippines' regions.

References 

2018 establishments in the Philippines
Anti-communist organizations in the Philippines
Far-right politics in Asia
Presidency of Rodrigo Duterte
Establishments by Philippine executive order